Zeppos may refer to:

People
Nicholas Zeppos (army general), Greek army general in the 1930s.
Nicholas S. Zeppos (born 1954), American lawyer and university administrator.

Other
Captain Zeppos, a Belgian children's television program in the 1960s.

See also
Zeppo Marx
The Zeppo